The S.A. Hall House is an historic house located at 147 North Main Street in Uxbridge, Massachusetts.  It is a   story wood-frame structure, with a cross-gable roof, clapboard and wood shingle siding, and a granite foundation.  A three-story square tower stands in a crook at the front of the house, topper by a pyramidal roof with a flared edge and bracketed eave.  It has decorative cut shingle work in the gables and in bands between the levels.  Its front porch, set in front of the tower, has a decorative bracketed frieze and turned posts.  Built c. 1890, it is one of Uxbridge's finest Queen Anne houses.  Its first documented owner (in 1898) was S. Alonzo Hall, publisher of the Uxbridge Compendium.

On October 7, 1983, it was added to the National Register of Historic Places.

See also
National Register of Historic Places listings in Uxbridge, Massachusetts

References

External links
 S. A. Hall House MACRIS Listing

Houses in Uxbridge, Massachusetts
National Register of Historic Places in Uxbridge, Massachusetts
Houses on the National Register of Historic Places in Worcester County, Massachusetts